Luis Joel Castro Rivera (born January 29, 1991) is a Puerto Rican track and field athlete who competes in the high jump event. He participated at the 2016 Summer Olympics in the high jump event where he reached the final.

Previously, on 28 May 2016, he equaled the national record with 2,29 m in Sinn, Germany.

References

External links
 
 

1991 births
Living people
People from Carolina, Puerto Rico
Puerto Rican male high jumpers
Athletes (track and field) at the 2016 Summer Olympics
Olympic track and field athletes of Puerto Rico
Athletes (track and field) at the 2019 Pan American Games
Pan American Games competitors for Puerto Rico
20th-century Puerto Rican people
21st-century Puerto Rican people